Ramón Bengaray Zabalza (February 2, 1896 – 1936) was a Spanish politician.

1896 births
1936 deaths
Politicians from Navarre
People from Roncal-Salazar
Politicians killed in the Spanish Civil War
Republican Left (Spain) politicians